Huntleys Point is a suburb on the Lower North Shore of Sydney, in the state of New South Wales, Australia. Huntleys Point is located nine kilometres north-west of the Sydney central business district, in the local government area of the Municipality of Hunter's Hill. Huntleys Point sits on the northern shore of the Parramatta River.

Gallery

References

External links
Discover Hunters Hill

Suburbs of Sydney
Municipality of Hunter's Hill